William Wayne Blanks (born September 1, 1955) is an American fitness personality, martial artist, actor, and the creator of the Tae Bo exercise program.

Early life and education
Blanks was born in Erie, Pennsylvania. He began his study of the martial arts at the age of eleven, attending Karate and Taekwondo classes. He was born with an anomaly in his hip joints that impaired his movement. The resulting clumsiness aroused taunts from Blanks' siblings and led his instructors to believe that he would never accomplish much. Blanks found the answer to these challenges in karate. When he saw Bruce Lee on TV, he decided he wanted to be a world martial-arts champion.

Career
Blanks was hired as a bodyguard for lead actress Catherine Bach during the filming of 1988's Driving Force, which was filmed in Manila during a time of political unrest. Blanks impressed the producers and was written into the script in a supporting role. This led to Blanks' work in several martial arts films, including King of the Kickboxers and Bloodfist. Blanks also appeared in the opening scene of Tony Scott's The Last Boy Scout, where he plays a doomed pro-football player. Blanks played Ashley Judd's kickboxing instructor in Kiss the Girls (1997).

In the late 1980s, Blanks developed the Tae Bo workout, while running a karate studio in Quincy, Massachusetts. He used components of his martial arts and boxing training. The name is a portmanteau of tae (as in taekwondo) and bo (as in boxing). Blanks opened a fitness center in Los Angeles to teach his new workout. He later attracted celebrity clients such as Paula Abdul, and the popularity of the workout quickly grew, becoming a pop culture phenomenon after Blanks began releasing mass-marketed videos. He sold over 1.5 million VHS tapes in his first year, and is reported to have grossed between $80 million and $130 million in sales.

Personal life
Blanks is a Christian and released a special line of Tae Bo workouts called the "Believer's" series that includes motivational prayers and other Christian components. He has appeared on the Christian television network TBN. He attended Crenshaw Christian Center.

In 1974, Blanks married Gayle H. Godfrey, whom he met in karate class. Shortly after the marriage, he adopted Gayle's daughter, Shellie, who was born in 1973. Shellie Blanks Cimarosti, a martial artist, is prominently featured in many Tae Bo videos. Shellie has also produced her own video called Tae Bo Postnatal Power, as well as hosted her father's new infomercial Tae Bo T3 (Total Transformation Training). Gayle and Blanks also have a son, Billy Blanks Jr., who works as a fitness instructor. Blanks Jr. produced several best-selling DVDs, including Cardioke and Fat Burning Hip Hop Mix. He has also starred in a touring production of the musical Fame, and has worked as a dancer in music videos with Madonna, Quincy Jones and Paula Abdul.

Blanks and Godfrey divorced in 2008 after 33 years of marriage. Godfrey filed for divorce, citing irreconcilable differences.

In November 2008, Blanks became the father of a new daughter, named Angelika. The mother is Tomoko Sato, whom Blanks met in 2007 when she worked as his Japanese interpreter. Blanks and Sato's marriage was formally registered in January 2009 and their wedding ceremony was held on June 20, 2009. He relocated to Japan in 2009.

Filmography

Film

Television

Music Video

References

Further reading

External links

 
 
 
 

1955 births
Living people
20th-century Christians
21st-century Christians
African-American Christians
African-American male actors
African-American sportsmen
American exercise instructors
American expatriates in Japan
American male film actors
American male karateka
American male taekwondo practitioners
Actors from Erie, Pennsylvania
Competitors at the 1981 World Games
Male actors from Pennsylvania
World Games bronze medalists
21st-century African-American people
20th-century African-American sportspeople